Year 114 (CXIV) was a common year starting on Sunday (link will display the full calendar) of the Julian calendar. At the time, it was known as the Year of the Consulship of Hasta and Vopiscus (or, less frequently, year 867 Ab urbe condita). The denomination 114 for this year has been used since the early medieval period, when the Anno Domini calendar era became the prevalent method in Europe for naming years.

Events

By place

Roman Empire 
 Construction begins on the Arch of Trajan in Benevento.
 The kingdom of Osroene becomes a vassal kingdom of the Roman Empire.
 Emperor Trajan defeats the Parthians and overruns Armenia and northern Mesopotamia.
 A monument to Philopappos, prince-in-exile of old Commagene (a buffer-state between Rome and Parthia) is erected in Athens.

Asia 
 First year of Yuanchu era of the Chinese Eastern Han Dynasty.

By topic

Religion 
 Change of Patriarch of Constantinople from Patriarch Sedecion to Patriarch Diogenes.

Births

Deaths

References